Vishweshwar Nath Khare was the 33rd Chief Justice of India, serving from 19 December 2002 to 2 May 2004. He was a judge of the Supreme Court of India from 21 March 1997 before he was elevated to the post of Chief Justice.

Early life
Khare was born in Allahabad on 2 May 1939. He lived in Allahabad for much of his life and attended St. Joseph's College, Allahabad. He further attended the Allahabad University. Khare was a First Class cricket player, playing for the state of Uttar Pradesh in Ranji Trophy matches in 1958.

Legal career
Khare started his career as an Advocate in the Allahabad High Court in 1961, where he practised on Civil, Writ and Revenue petitions. He was appointed Chief Standing Counsel for the Government of Uttar Pradesh. On 25 June 1983, he was appointed a Judge of the Allahabad High Court. In early 1996, he was appointed Chief Justice of the Calcutta High Court, from where he was elevated to the Supreme Court of India a year later.

Emergency

As an Advocate in 1975, Khare and his uncle, S. C. Khare, represented Indira Gandhi, Prime Minister of India, in her famous case against Raj Narain, alleging electoral malpractices. He was responsible for advocating the case that got the order of the High Court stayed until an appeal could be filed in the Supreme Court. The decision of the Supreme Court led to the imposition of Emergency in India for a period of 19 months, the only suspension of democracy the country has seen since Independence in 1947.

Gujarat violence

During his tenure as the Chief Justice of India, Khare was confronted with the failure of the justice system in the aftermath of the Gujarat violence following the Godhra train burning. His decision to reopen the Best Bakery Case provided some recourse for victims of the violence. Speaking to The Hindu newspaper when he retired he said, "I found there was complete collusion between the accused and the prosecution in Gujarat, throwing rule of law to the winds. The Supreme Court had to step in to break the collusion to ensure protection to the victims and the witnesses. I was anguished and pained by the turn of events during the trial of the riot cases but was determined to salvage the criminal justice delivery system."

In interviews to the media in 2004, Khare explained why he decided to transfer the Best Bakery case to Maharashtra for a retrial. In a 2012 interview, Khare gave details about the Best Bakery case and the Gulbarg Society massacre in explaining why he believed the 2002 Gujarat Violence was an instance of a "state sponsored genocide".

Post retirement
Since retiring as Chief Justice of India, Khare comments occasionally on national television and press on issues of jurisprudence. His comments on the Jessica Lal murder case echoed the sentiments expressed during the Gujarat riots. He is also appointed the Chancellor of Central University of Jharkhand.

Criticism
Khare's comments on there being an appearance of complicity between the state government and the rioters during the 2002 Gujarat violence have been criticized by Narendra Modi (The former Chief Minister of Gujarat and member of the Hindutva R.S.S. aligned BJP.)  . According to Modi:

Awards and honors
Khare was awarded the Padma Vibhushan, India's second highest civilian honour in 2006.

References

External links
LegalEra Magazine Interview
Padma Vibhushan awarded to V N Khare - News item

Living people
Recipients of the Padma Vibhushan in public affairs
Scholars from Allahabad
Chief justices of India
University of Allahabad alumni
1939 births
Judges of the Allahabad High Court
Chief Justices of the Calcutta High Court
20th-century Indian lawyers
21st-century Indian lawyers
21st-century Indian judges